Dapéoua is a town in south-western Ivory Coast. It is a sub-prefecture of Buyo Department in Nawa Region, Bas-Sassandra District.

The south-western third of the sub-prefecture is located in Taï National Park.

Dapéoua was a commune until March 2012, when it became one of 1126 communes nationwide that were abolished.

In 2014, the population of the sub-prefecture of Dapéoua was 80,658.

Villages
The nine villages of the sub-prefecture of Dapéoua and their population in 2014 are:
 Belleville (14 530 ) 
 Dapéoua (10 758 ) 
 Gnagboya V4 (7 158 ) 
 Gribouo (5 215 )
 Kodaya V5 (6 543 )
 Lobogba (10 498 )
 Loboville (12 348 )
 Sagboya V6 (7 072 )
 Trawaininkro (6 536 )

References

Sub-prefectures of Nawa Region
Former communes of Ivory Coast